The 2004 Skate Canada International was the second event of six in the 2004–05 ISU Grand Prix of Figure Skating, a senior-level international invitational competition series. It was held at the Metro Centre in Halifax, Nova Scotia on October 28–31. Medals were awarded in disciplines of men's singles, ladies' singles, pair skating, and ice dancing. Skaters earned points toward qualifying for the 2004–05 Grand Prix Final. The compulsory dance was the rhumba.

Results

Men

Ladies

Pairs

Ice dancing

External links
 2004 Skate Canada International

Skate Canada International, 2004
Skate Canada International
Sport in Halifax, Nova Scotia
Skate
2004 in Nova Scotia